Below is a list of all Doncaster Rovers managers that have taken the reins since the appointment of Billy Calder in 1920. In the 41 years prior to Calder, the team was selected by club committee, a standard practice by football clubs at the time. After Brian Flynn was appointed Director of Football, Paul Dickov became the club's 40th full-time manager.

Managers

References

 
Doncaster Rovers